Clayton Rhys Lewis (born 12 February 1997 in Wellington) is a New Zealand professional footballer who plays as a midfielder for Wellington Phoenix in the A-League.

Club career
Lewis attended St Patrick's College, Wellington from 2010 until 2014. He began his career with Wellington Olympic where he played alongside his father Barry. Lewis came into prominence in the 2013 winter season where he was a key member of the Wellington Olympic team which finished second in the Central Premier League and reached the semifinals of the Chatham Cup. This exposure led his to being signed by Team Wellington for the 2013–14 ASB Premiership season. However, he did not make an appearance for Team Wellington.

On 1 July 2014 he was signed on a free transfer by Wanderers SC. Lewis made his debut on 22 November 2014 on the fifth match of the season away at WaiBOP United in a 3–0 win in which he scored. He would go on to make 11 appearances, score 3 goals and assist another 3 for the Wanderers that season before joining reigning champions Auckland City.

On 28 September 2017, Lewis signed a contract with League One club Scunthorpe United. Following minimal playing time over the three seasons he spent at Scunthorpe, Lewis' contract was terminated by mutual consent and he returned to Auckland City on 4 November 2019.

Lewis signed a one-year deal with A-League club Wellington Phoenix in October 2020. On 18 May 2021, his contract was extended for an additional two years. In March 2022, Lewis was ruled out for 12 weeks with an ankle injury obtained during a match against Perth Glory.

International career
Lewis made his international debut for New Zealand on 31 March 2015 against South Korea, playing 54 minutes in a 1–0 defeat.

He has also made several appearances for the New Zealand under-20 team starting in April 2015. He is part of the under-20 side for the 2015 FIFA U-20 World Cup in New Zealand. He scored his first FIFA U-20 World Cup goal against Myanmar in a 5–1 group stage win at Westpac Stadium in Wellington.

In the 2017 FIFA Confederations Cup, Lewis assisted Chris Wood's goal against Mexico to put New Zealand up 1–0 in Sochi; this was New Zealand's only goal in the competition.

During New Zealand's 4–0 victory against Fiji at the 2022 FIFA World Cup qualifiers, Lewis converted a penalty kick to score his first international goal.

International goals

References

External links
 

1997 births
Living people
Association footballers from Wellington City
New Zealand association footballers
New Zealand under-20 international footballers
New Zealand international footballers
Team Wellington players
Wanderers Special Club players
Auckland City FC players
Wellington Phoenix FC players
New Zealand Football Championship players
2017 FIFA Confederations Cup players
Scunthorpe United F.C. players
English Football League players
Association football midfielders
Footballers at the 2020 Summer Olympics
New Zealand expatriate sportspeople in England
Olympic association footballers of New Zealand